Haal – E – dil, shortened as HED, (translation: The State of Heart), directed by Anil Devgan, is a 2008 romance film starring Adhyayan Suman and Amita Patak. Story wise, it was the debut of actor, Adhyayan Suman, who is the son of retro-actor Shekhar Suman. The film deals with issues of the "love within" the human psyche and how it manifests itself. It is based on the love stories of three people. The movie, also stars Nakuul Mehta, who plays a painter, named Shekhar, who woos Sanjana (Amita Phatak), but only to find she has a long-lost boyfriend, Rohit (Adhyayan Suman), who she believes, is no more. The film opened to theatres on 20 June 2008. Although it received generally mixed reviews, the movie was declared as the first big flop of 2008.

Plot 
While traveling by train Shekhar Oberoi attempts to woo Sanjana Sharma, but finds out she had given her heart to a former boyfriend, Rohit, who is no more. Both share some misadventures en route to Simla, and upon arrival Shekhar openly declares his love for her knowing fully that this decision will bring nothing but heartbreak for him

Cast 
 Adhyayan Suman as Rohit Bakshi
 Amita Pathak as Sanjana Sharma
 Nakuul Mehta as Shekhar Oberoi
 Himani Shivpuri as Stella
 Mukesh Tiwari as Speedy Shing
 Bharti Achrekar as Aunty in train
 Tanuja
 Kajol ... Special Appearance
 Ajay Devgn ... Special Appearance
 Sanjay Mishra

Soundtrack 
The soundtrack was released by T-Series on 22 May 2008.
It consisted of 9 tracks composed by Anand Raj Anand, Vishal Bhardwaj, Raghav Sachar & Pritam.

Track listing

Reception 
Noyon Jyoti Parasara of AOL India rated the film 2 out of 5 and stated, "The movie is based on one line – Magic starts where logic ends. But magic alone can't carry a film. You got to add logic too!"

References

External links 
 

Films scored by Anand Raj Anand
2008 films
2000s Hindi-language films
2008 romantic comedy films
Films featuring songs by Pritam
Films scored by Vishal Bhardwaj
Films scored by Raghav Sachar
Indian romantic musical films